The 1994 Macau Grand Prix Formula Three was the 41st Macau Grand Prix race to be held on the streets of Macau on 20 November 1994. It was the eleventh edition for Formula Three cars.

Entry list

Race

References

External links
 The official website of the Macau Grand Prix

Macau Grand Prix
Grand
Macau